Samina River is a name of several rivers.

 Samina River, a river in Liechtenstein and Austria;
 Samina River, a tributary of the Andoma River, Vologda Oblast, Russia.